Club de Rugby Santander, known for sponsorship reasons as Bathco Rugby Club or simply as Bathco, is a Spanish rugby team from the city of Santander, founded in 2007. The senior men's first team competes in the top tier of Spanish rugby, the División de Honor de Rugby, and plays their matches at the Ruth Beitia Municipal Sports Complex.

History 

Since its formation, the club has focused its efforts on the promotion of sport and rugby in particular among the youngest members of society. It currently has more than 180 players, 17 coaches and plays in a total of 9 categories.

The club signed a sponsorship agreement with bathroom supplier Bathco for the 2016–17 season, the year in which the senior team achieved promotion to Division of Honor B from the AON Norte league. For the 2017/2018 season, the agreement was extended and the club was renamed Bathco Rugby Club.

The club has always maintained a great rivalry with the most successful club in the city of Santander, Independiente RC, a team formerly sponsored by Bathco and one with which they currently share a ground.

On 2 June 2019, the club gained promotion to the División de Honor, Spanish rugby's top tier, after defeating CR La Vila in the promotion playoffs.

Their first season in the top tier has proved to be a stern test, and as of 29 February 2020, they lie 11th in the table. The club's current predicament has been hampered by its away form: they are yet to win a single game outside of Cantabria. Their home form has seen some bright spots, with handsome wins against CR Cisneros, Hernani CRE, a close victory over Ciencias Sevilla CR and a draw with UBU Colina Clinic from eight games.

Club colours 

The club's home kit is primarily black, with green accents. The away kit is varying shades of green with black and green socks.

The club's crest depicts a blue outline seal balancing a rugby ball on its nose. The seal is surrounded by a blue circle, which is itself surrounded by a green ring bearing the club's name. The animal gives the club its nickname, "las focas", with foca being the Spanish word for seal.

Stadium 
Santander shares the Complejo Municipal Ruth Beitia with its city rivals Independiente. The site, run by the Santander city council, is a collection of 35 different facilities for various sports. Due to increased local interest, the derby match between Independiente and Batcho on 29 February was played at the El Malecón stadium in nearby Torrelavega. A narrow 27–21 victory for Independiente meant that the side completed a double over Bathco, having defeated them 30–20 in October 2019.

Season-by-season record

2018–19 Standings 
The 2018–19 season saw Bathco win Group A of the second-tier División de Honor B, winning 20 of their 22 games and scoring an average of over 40 points a game. The club qualified for the promotion playoffs.

Source: http://ferugby.es/clasificacion-division-honor-b-grupo-a

Playoffs
The club progressed to the promotion playoffs, playing two-legged games against the best-placed finishing teams from other regions. They won five of the six games, losing the final to Ciencias Sevilla CR despite winning the second leg away from home. This victory earned Ciencias automatic promotion, and meant Bathco had to play the promotion/relegation playoff with the side finishing second-from-bottom in the top tier.

Source: http://ferugby.es/calendario-promocion-division-de-honor

Promotion/relegation playoff 
Promotion was sealed when Bathco won their two-legged tie against La Vila, the team that had finished 11th in the División de Honor.

Current Squad 2019–2020 
The club has a large foreign contingent, with many players notably coming from the Argentinian union. Lock Juan Cruz Guillemaín has even represented Argentina at international level. Zimbabwean Niels Van de Ven, formerly of Dutch club Castricumse RC, is the club captain.

The club's coach and assistant coach, Agustín Rodríguez and Luciano Marco, are both Argentinian.

|-

|-

|-

|-

|-

|-

|-

|-

|-

References

Sports teams in Cantabria
Spanish rugby union teams